The 1957 season was the forty-sixth season for Santos FC.

References

External links
Official Site 

Santos
1957
1957 in Brazilian football